Brachyhammus raffreyi is a species of beetle in the family Cerambycidae, and the only species in the genus Brachyhammus. It was described by Thomson in 1878.

References

Lamiini
Beetles described in 1878